Omnia may refer to:

 Omnia (band), a pagan folk band from the Netherlands
 Omnia (DJ), Ukrainian trance/progressive house DJ and producer
 Samsung Omnia, a group of smartphones by Samsung
 Omnia Township, Cowley County, Kansas
 Omnia, a fictional nation in the Discworld universe

See also
 
 Omni (disambiguation)
 Omnis (disambiguation)